The Erath Memorial Arch,  in Stephenville, Texas, was listed on the National Register of Historic Places in 2018.

It is not an arch, but rather is a two-part stone gate, built in 1936 as part of celebration of the Texas Centennial.

It is located at N. Erath Ave. & W. Washington St. in Stephenville.

It was designed by local architect C.V. Head and was carved by Dublin, Texas rock mason Arthur Maxwell.

References

Further reading
Erath Arches, 1936, at University of Texas archive

External links

National Register of Historic Places in Erath County, Texas
Monuments and memorials in Texas
Buildings and structures completed in 1936
Texas Revolution monuments and memorials
History of Texas